Michael Sherwood House is a historic home located at Greensboro, Guilford County, North Carolina. It was built between 1849 and 1851, and is a two-story, three bay by two bay, Greek Revival style brick dwelling with an original, one-story rear brick wing.  Later additions include a second story to the rear wing, a curious stair tower and several rooms, and a full-height front portico with Roman Doric order columns.

It was listed on the National Register of Historic Places in 1978.

References

Houses on the National Register of Historic Places in North Carolina
Greek Revival houses in North Carolina
Houses completed in 1851
Houses in Greensboro, North Carolina
National Register of Historic Places in Guilford County, North Carolina
1851 establishments in North Carolina